The Vista Theater is a theatre located at 218 Iron Street in Negaunee, Michigan. It was listed on the National Register of Historic Places in 2005.

History 
Jafet J. Rytkonen was born in Finland in 1879 and came to Negaunee to work in the iron mines in 1902. However, he quickly changed professions and partnered with John Lammi to open a grocery and soda pop business. In 1911, Rytkonen partnered with August Allen to build and operate the Star Theater, located a short distance from the current site of the Vista. In 1925, Rytkonen purchased the lot where the Vista stands in order to build a new theater.  Rytkonen wanted to construct a larger, grander, and more modern theatre than the Star.

Rytkonen hired architect David E. Anderson of Iron River to design the Vista, and construction began in the spring of 1925. Rytkonen hired Pfeffer Construction Company of Duluth, Minnesota and John Kielinen of Ishpeming to construct  the Vista, and  Trembath Brothers of Ishpeming to do the interior decorating. The new theatre opened on September 20, 1926.  Rytkonen ran the theatre until his retirement in 1950, after which his son, William, and son-in-law, Peter Ghiardi, took over management of the Vista.

The Vista Theater remained open until 1972, when William Rytkonen died.  In 1973, a group of local citizens formed the Peninsula Arts Appreciation Council (PAAC).  This group took over the Vista and in 1975 began using it as a venue for multiple artistic forms, including amateur theater productions, musical programs and concerts, films, puppet shows, art exhibits, and arts workshops.  In the 2000s, the group began restoration of the theatre, and on July 22, 2005 the structure was listed on the National Register of Historic Places.  PAAC continues to operate the Vista and in 2014 thanks to a grant from the Cliffs/Eagle Foundation installed a digital projector and screen making it one of the few facilities left in the United States that acts as both a playhouse and movie theater.

On August 26, 2020, a large section of the roof over the seating area collapsed. The Vista Theater Advisory Board began working to stabilize the walls and clean the interior before the start of winter. The board started a fundraiser to raise $100,000 for the repairs. Contractors began removing debris on November 19.

Architecture
The Vista is a three-story Commercial Brick theater which was designed both for stage and motion picture productions. It measures , and is constructed of yellow-buff brick over hollow tile. The facade has a slightly projecting bay at each end flanking a central entrance area. The projecting bays each contain a large rectangular panel of basket-weave brickwork, and the central area contains the entryway on the first floor, and broad banks of square-head windows on the second floor, and broadly arched windows on the third floor. A narrow metal classical cornice runs across the top of the facade, arching above the central third floor windows to match their curve. The first floor of the facade was modernized in the 1940s, and now contains banded salmon and maroon enameled metal paneling, with a V-shaped marquee projecting above the entrance.

The interior contains an auditorium with a flat ceiling and a deep rear balcony. The balcony has simple classical architectural details such as pilasters and cornices The walls and ceiling are painted in an Art Deco style, with tapestries hung on the side walls between the pilasters. The front of the auditorium contains a stage, with fly loft and wings, and six dressing rooms below it.

References

External links

Vista Theater

Buildings and structures in Marquette County, Michigan
Theatres on the National Register of Historic Places in Michigan
Theatres completed in 1926
1926 establishments in Michigan
National Register of Historic Places in Marquette County, Michigan